Shane McGrath (born 4 March 1964) is a former Australian rules footballer who played one game for Hawthorn in the Victorian Football League in 1984.  He was recruited from Trafalgar, Victoria.

References

External links

1964 births
Australian rules footballers from Victoria (Australia)
Hawthorn Football Club players
Living people